The knowledge economy (or the knowledge-based economy) is an economic system in which the production of goods and services is based principally on knowledge-intensive activities that contribute to advancement in technical and scientific innovation. The key element of value is the greater dependence on human capital and intellectual property for the source of the innovative ideas, information and practices. Organisations are required to capitalise this "knowledge" into their production to stimulate and deepen the business development process. There is less reliance on physical input and natural resources. A knowledge-based economy relies on the crucial role of intangible assets within the organisations' settings in facilitating modern economic growth.

A knowledge economy features a highly skilled workforce within the microeconomic and macroeconomic environment; institutions and industries create jobs that demand specialized skills in order to meet the global market needs. Knowledge is viewed as an additional input to labour and capital.  In principle, one's primary individual capital is knowledge together with the ability to perform so as to create economic value.

In a knowledge economy, highly skilled jobs require excellent technical skills and relational skills such as problem-solving, the flexibility to interface with multiple discipline areas as well as the ability to adapt to changes as opposed to moving or crafting physical objects in conventional manufacturing-based economies. A knowledge economy stands in contrast to an agrarian economy, in which the primary economic activity is subsistence farming for which the main requirement is manual labour or an industrialized economy that features mass production in which most of the workers are relatively unskilled.

A knowledge economy emphasizes the importance of skills in a service economy, the third phase of economic development, also called a post-industrial economy. It is related to an information economy, which emphasizes the importance of information as non-physical capital, and a digital economy, which emphasizes the degree to which information technology facilitates trade. For companies, intellectual property such as trade secrets, copyrighted material, and patented processes become more valuable in a knowledge economy than in earlier eras.

The global economy transition to a knowledge economy is also referred to as the Information Age, bringing about an information society.
The term knowledge economy was made famous by Peter Drucker as the title of Chapter 12 in his book The Age of Discontinuity (1969), that Drucker attributed to economist Fritz Machlup, originating in the idea of scientific management developed by Frederick Winslow Taylor.

Concepts

Knowledge-based economy and human capital 
An economic system that is not knowledge-based is considered to be inconceivable. It describes the process of consumption and production activities that are satisfied from the application of workers' expertise - intellectual capital and typically represents a significant level of individual economic activities in modern developed economies through building an interconnected and advanced global economy where sources of knowledge are the critical contributors.

The present concept for "knowledge" is origins from the historical and philosophical studies by Gilbert Ryle and Israel Scheffler who conducted knowledge to the terms "procedural knowledge" and "conceptual Knowledge" and identified two types of skills: "routine competencies or facilities" and "critical skills" that is intelligent performance; and it's further elaborated by Lundvall and Johnson who defined "knowledge" economically highlighting four broad categories:

 Know-what : is of the knowledge about "facts", presenting the ownership of information. Examples include population of a country and history evidence. As with information revolution is emerging, complex occupations such as law and medicine remain highly demanding for knowledge and expertise under this category.
 Know-why : is of the study within the human mind and society at the base of the knowledge of principles and laws of motion in nature. It concerns the theoretical research of scientific and technological fields, which is essential for allowing innovation in the production process and products development in areas such as universities and specialised firms. It can also reduce error frequency in procedures.
 Know-who : refers to the specific and selective social relations, that is the identification of the key persons that know the solutions and are able to perform under difficult scenarios. Finding the right people can be more essential than knowing basic scientific knowledge for the success of innovation.
 Know-how : is of an individual's skills and experience to do different kinds of things on a practical level. Individuals share experiences in groups with uniform practices. It constitutes the human capital of enterprises.

In a knowledge economy, human intellectual is the key engine of economic enhancement. It is an economy where members acquire, create, disseminate and apply knowledge for facilitating economic and social development. The World Bank has spoken of knowledge economies by associating it to a four - pillar framework that analyses the rationales of a human capital based economies:

 An educated and skilled labour force: The establishment of a strong knowledge-based economy required workers to have the ability to continuously learn and apply their skills to build and practice knowledge efficiently.
 A dense and modern information infrastructure: is of the easy access to the information and communication technology (ICT) resources in order to overcome the barrier of high transaction cost, and to facilitate the effectiveness in interacting, disseminating and processing the information and knowledge resources.
 An effective innovation system: a great level of innovation within firms, industries, and countries to keep up with the latest global technology and human intelligence so as to utilize it for the domestic economy
 Institutional regime that supports incentives for entrepreneurship and the use of knowledge: An economy system should offer incentives to allow for better efficiency in mobilizing and allocating resources, together with encouraging entrepreneurship.

The advancement of a knowledge-based economy occurred when global economies promote changes in material production, together with the creation of rich mechanisms of economic theories after the second world war that tend to integrate science, technology and the economy.

Peter Drucker discussed the knowledge economy in the book-The Effective Executive 1966, where he described the difference between the manual workers and the knowledge workers. The manual worker is the one who works with their own hands and produces goods and services. In contrast, the knowledge worker works with their head, rather than hands, and produces ideas, knowledge as well as information.

Definitions around "knowledge" are considered to be vague in terms of the formalization and modelling of a knowledge economy, as it is rather a relative concept. For example, there is no sufficient evidence and consideration in whether the "information society" could serve or act as " knowledge society" interchangeably. Information in general, is not equivalent to knowledge. Their use depends on the individual and groups preferences which are "economy-dependent". Information and knowledge together are production resources that can exist without interacting with other sources. Resources are of highly independent of each other in a sense that if they connect with other available resources, they transfer into factors of productions immediately; and production factors are present only to interact with other factors. Knowledge associated with intellectual information then is said to be a production factor in the new economy that is distinguished from the traditional production factors.

Evolution
From the early days of economic studies, though economists recognised the essential link between knowledge and economic growth, it was still identified only as a supplemental element in economic factors. The idea behind has transformed in recent years when new growth theory gave praise to knowledge and technology in enhancing productivity and economic advancement.

Thus far, the developed society has transitioned from an agriculture-based economy, that is, the pre-industrial age where economy and wealth is primarily based upon agriculture, to an industrial economy where the manufacturing sector was booming. In the mid-1900s, the world economies moved towards a post-industrial or mass production system, where it is driven by the service sector that creates greater wealth than the manufacturing industry; to the late 1900s - 2000s, knowledge economy emerged with the highlights of the power of knowledge and human capital sector, and is now marked as the latest stage of development in global economic restructuring. In the final decades of 20th century, the knowledge economy became greatly associated with sectors based in research-intensive and high-technology industries as a result of the steadily increased demand for sophisticated science-based innovations. Knowledge economy operates differently from the past as it has been identified by the upheavals (sometimes referred to as the knowledge revolution) in technological innovations and globally competitive need for differentiation with new goods and services, and processes that develop from the research community (i.e., R&D factors, universities, labs, educational institutes).Thomas A. Stewart points out that just as the industrial revolution did not end agriculture because people have to eat, the knowledge revolution is unlikely to end the industry because society remains in demands for physical goods and services. .

For the modern knowledge economies, especially the developed countries, information and knowledge have always taken on enormous importance in the development in either traditional or industrial economy, in particular for the efficient use of factors of production. Owners of production factors should possess and master information and knowledge so as to apply it during one's economic activity. In the knowledge economy, the specialised labor force is characterised as computer literate and well-trained in handling data, developing algorithms and simulated models, and innovating on processes and systems. Harvard Business School Professor, Michael Porter, asserts that today's economy is far more dynamic and that conventional notion of comparative advantages within a company has changed and is less relevant than the prevailing idea of competitive advantages which rests on "making more productive use of inputs, which requires continual innovation". As such, the technical STEM careers, including computer scientists, engineers, chemists, biologists, mathematicians, and scientific inventors will see continuous demand in years to come. Professor Porter further argues that a well situated clusters (that is, geographic concentrations of interconnected companies and institutions in a particular field) is vital with global economies, connect locally and globally with linked industries, manufacturers, and other entities that are related by skills, technologies, and other common inputs. Hence, knowledge is the catalyst and connective tissue in modern economies. Ruggles and Holtshouse argue the change is characterised by a dispersion of power and by managers who lead by empowering knowledge workers to contribute and make decisions.

With Earth's depleting natural resources, the need for green infrastructure, a logistics industry forced into just-in-time deliveries, growing global demand, regulatory policy governed by performance results, and a host of other items high priority is put on knowledge; and research becomes paramount. Knowledge provides the technical expertise, problem-solving, performance measurement and evaluation, and data management needed for the trans-boundary, interdisciplinary global scale of today's competition.

Worldwide examples of the knowledge economy taking place among many others include: Silicon Valley, United States; aerospace and automotive engineering in Munich, Germany; biotechnology in Hyderabad, India; electronics and digital media in Seoul, South Korea; petrochemical and energy industry in Brazil. Many other cities and regions try to follow a knowledge-driven development paradigm and increase their knowledge base by investing in higher education and research institutions in order to attract high skilled labour and better position themselves in the global competition. Yet, despite digital tools democratising access to knowledge, research shows that knowledge economy activities remain as concentrated as ever in traditional economic cores.

The prevailing and future economic development will be highly dominated by the technologies and network expansion, in particular on the knowledge-based social entrepreneurship and the entrepreneurship as a whole. The Knowledge economy is incorporating the network economy, where the relatively localised knowledge is now being shared among and across various networks for the benefit of the network members as a whole, to gain economies of scale in a wider, more open scale.

Globalisation 
The rapid globalisation of economic activities is one of the main determinants of the emerging knowledge economy. While there are no doubts on the other stages of relative openness in the global economy, the prevailing pace and intensity of globalisation are of an extent without precedent. The fundamental microeconomic forces are the significant drives of globalizing economic activities and further demands for human intelligence. Forces such as the rapid integration of the world financial and capital market since the early 1980s, which influences essentially on each level of the developed country's financial systems; increased multinational origin of the inputs to productions of both goods and services, technology transfers and information flow etc.

Technology
The technology requirements for a national innovation system as described by the World Bank Institute must be able to disseminate a unified process by which a working method may converge scientific and technology solutions, and organizational solutions.  According to the World Bank Institute's definition, such innovation would further enable the World Bank Institute's vision outlined in their Millennium Development Goals.

Challenges for developing countries
The United Nations Commission on Science and Technology for Development report (UNCSTD, 1997) concluded that for developing countries to successfully integrate ICTs and sustainable development in order to participate in the knowledge economy they need to intervene collectively and strategically. Such collective intervention suggested would be in the development of effective national ICT policies that support the new regulatory framework, promote the selected knowledge production, and use of ICTs and harness their organizational changes to be in line with the Millennium Development Goals. The report further suggests that developing countries to develop the required ICT strategies and policies for institutions and regulations taking into account the need to be responsive to the issues of convergence.

See also

Attention economy
Automation
Basic income guarantee
Cognitive-cultural economy
Computational knowledge economy
Digital Revolution
Digital economy
Endogenous growth theory
Frugal innovation
History of knowledge
Information economy
Indigo Era
Industrial espionage
International Innovation Index
Internet economy
Information revolution
Information society
Know-how trading
Knowledge Economic Index
Knowledge market
Knowledge organization
Knowledge management
Knowledge market
Knowledge policy
Knowledge production modes
Knowledge society
Knowledge tagging

Knowledge value chain
Learning economy
Learning society
Liverpool Knowledge Quarter
Long tail
Network economy
Precision agriculture
Productivity improving technologies (historical)
Purple economy
Smart city
Social information processing
Working hours

Notes

Bibliography

Arthur, W. B. (1996). Increasing Returns and the New World of Business. Harvard Business Review(July/August), 100–109.
Bell, D. (1974). The Coming of Post-Industrial Society: A Venture in Social Forecasting. London: Heinemann.
Drucker, P. (1969). The Age of Discontinuity; Guidelines to Our changing Society. New York: Harper and Row.
Drucker, P. (1993). Post-Capitalist Society. Oxford: Butterworth Heinemann.
Machlup, F. (1962). The Production and Distribution of Knowledge in the United States. Princeton: Princeton University Press.
Porter, M. E. Clusters and the New Economics of Competition. Harvard Business Review. (Nov-Dec 1998). 77–90.
Powell, Walter W. & Snellman, Kaisa (2004). "The Knowledge Economy". Annual Review of Sociology 30 (1): 199–220
Rindermann H. (2012). Intellectual classes, technological progress and economic development: The rise of cognitive capitalism. Personality and Individual Differences 53 (2) 108–113
Rooney, D., Hearn, G., Mandeville, T., & Joseph, R. (2003). Public Policy in Knowledge-Based Economies: Foundations and Frameworks. Cheltenham: Edward Elgar.
Rooney, D., Hearn, G., & Ninan, A. (2005). Handbook on the Knowledge Economy. Cheltenham: Edward Elgar.
Stehr, Nico (2002). Knowledge and Economic Conduct. The Social Foundations of the Modern Economy. Toronto: University of Toronto Press.
The Brookings Institution. MetroPolicy: Shaping A New Federal Partnership for a Metropolitan Nation. Metropolitan Policy Program Report. (2008). 4–103.

External links

Legal and Regulatory Issues in the Information Economy (Wikibook)

 
Economics catchphrases
Information Age
Business intelligence terms
Social information processing